Quatt is a small village in Shropshire, England in the Severn Valley. The civil parish, formally known as Quatt Malvern, has a population of 219 according to the 2001 census, reducing to 200 at the 2011 census.

It lies on the A442 south of Bridgnorth. 

There are places to visit like the Quatt Village Hall and activities to take part in, from the local Cricket Club to Bell Ringing. In 2017, Quatt Village Hall won the 'Most Welcoming Village Hall award'.

Dudmaston Hall is located in the parish.

Notable people
Charles Babbage, computing pioneer, married Georgiana Whitmore of Dudmaston and lived for significant periods at Dudmaston Hall himself, where he planned the house's central heating system.
Samuel Gilbert, writer on horticulture, was rector here in the later 17th century.
Sir George Labouchere, British diplomat and modern art collector, lived at Dudmaston Hall in retirement.
Thomas Orde Lawder Wilkinson, posthumous Victoria Cross recipient in World War I was born at Lodge Farm on the Dudmaston estate and has a commemorative plaque at Quatt Church.
William Wolryche Whitmore of Dudmaston Hall, Whig politician of the early 19th century, buried at Quatt
David York, England cricketer

See also
Listed buildings in Quatt Malvern
Quatford

Notes

External links

Villages in Shropshire
Civil parishes in Shropshire